Vanchippattu is a poetic form in Malayalam composed entirely in the Dravidian metre Nathonnata. It is originated from Kerala, a state in India.

History 

This poetic form was created by Ramapurathu Warrier, a poet in Malayalam lived in Travancore (later became a part of Kerala) during the reign of the king Anizham Thirunal Marthanda Varma. It is believed that it was created during a boat travel of Ramapurathu Warrier along with the King Marthanda Varma. Warrier recited his poem to the king. This poem was later became the famous poetic collection Kuchelavritham Vanchippattu.

Etymology 

The word Vanchippattu is a combination of two words vanchi means Boat and pattu means song. This poetic form has a rhythm similar to that of rowing the boat. Hence it got this name, according to historians.

List of some famous Vanchippattu 

 Kuchelavritham
 Lakshmanopadesham
 Parthasarathi Varnana
 Bheeshmaparvam
 Santhanagopalam
 Banayudham

Famous Vanchippattu poets 

 Vaaladisseri Sankaranarayanan Achari
 Champakulam Puthenpurayil Joseph
 I. C. Chacko
 Chirayinkeezhu Govindan Pillai
 Nedumprayar Gopalapilla Vaidyan

See also

Ramapurathu Warrier

References 

Malayalam-language literature